Alien Mind is an action-adventure game for the Apple IIGS, published and released by PBI Software in 1988. It is the final game from PBI, and notable as a GS-only title, in taking advantage of the graphics and sound capabilities of the machine to present an arcade style game.

Plot
Two unhatched alien eggs, discovered in the Herzgod IV solar system, have been brought aboard the newly built five level Zekford Space Station. Timothy Hunter, after receiving a telegram from Aaron Avery–a long-time friend and associate Biologist, boards the Zekford Space Station to join him to study the eggs.  The player takes the role of Hunter, who upon arrival, discovers everyone on the station has been killed. Avery, the only survivor and in hiding, informs him one of the eggs has hatched and released a super-intelligent alien. It has reprogrammed the station's security and maintenance robots to kill all humans, and is mind controlling lesser alien animal lifeforms (freed from the on-board research labs) to do the same. The alien itself has gone off into hiding and tapped into the station's central computer system, which is linked to everything. The alien closely monitors the computer terminals, the only means of communication between Hunter and Avery.

Hunter traverses the station, descending level by level, while fighting off killer robots, alien monsters and avoiding automated station defenses. At various points Avery is able to leave password-protected messages for Hunter by hacking into the station's various public service systems. Avery formulates a plan to defeat the alien while using cryptic clues and puzzles as passwords, hoping to throw it off and buy time in the process. It is decided the alien must be destroyed and the second egg stopped from hatching, or all of humanity is doomed. Towards the end of the game, pieces of a gun weapon are collected and assembled to use in a final confrontation with the alien.

Gameplay
As an overhead 2D multi-directional scroller, the player navigates large rooms, corridors and maze-like passage ways aboard the Zekford Space Station. The player starts off with a needle-gun to defend himself against enemies that continually re-spawn. More powerful guns can be found and collected as the game progresses. Other collectable items include: ammo, health packs, energy conductors (slows enemies), energy shields (temporary invincibility) and key cards. Some special items found are necessary for completing a level (e.g. repair tool kit, elevator passes, printed schematics, chemicals, weapon parts).

The player can jump, shoot, access computer terminals and sit in chairs (necessary, as some terminals are seated). There are dozens of installed terminals, but only the correct one can access Avery's messages and must be located by the player. Corpses littering the floor may impede progress, however jumping or boarding a hovercraft prevents that. Locked doors can only be opened using key cards collected.

When logged into a terminal Avery has previously hacked, a correct password must be typed, provided through clues and puzzles. New messages reveal where the next terminal can be found, instructions for the next task or where special items can be located. All pieces of the super gun weapon must be collected before confronting the alien. The story unfolds and revealed in greater details through messages read on the terminal screens.

Reception
John Munn reviewed the game for Computer Gaming World, and stated that "Alien Mind is an easily embraceable game designed with a relatively simple blending of strategic role-playing with the finger-itching excitement of an arcade game."

References

External links
Review in Computist
Review in Apple Bug
Review in InCider
Review in Applicando (Italian)
Review in Guida Videogiochi (Italian)
Review in Apple Soft (Italian)
Review in Tilt

1988 video games
Apple IIGS games
Apple IIGS-only games
PBI Software games
Run and gun games
Top-down video games
Video games about extraterrestrial life
Video games developed in the United States
Video games set in outer space